Alexander Lawrence (ca 1847 – August 4, 1899) was a Scottish-born farmer and political figure in Manitoba. He represented Morden from 1888 to 1892 in the Legislative Assembly of Manitoba as a Liberal.

He was born in Kinross-shire, the son of John Lawrence, and was educated in Scotland and England. In 1880, Lawrence married Margaret Bond. He died in Gretna, Manitoba at the age of 52.

References 

Year of birth uncertain
1899 deaths
Manitoba Liberal Party MLAs
Scottish emigrants to Canada
Canadian farmers